Hoppit Mead is a 9.2 hectare Local Nature Reserve in Braintree in Essex. It is owned and managed by Braintree District Council.

This linear site has formal park areas, wildflower meadows, scrub, wet woodland and coppice. The River Brain runs through it. The seventeenth century naturalist John Ray made pioneering observations of wild blackcurrant bushes in the wet woodland.

There is access to the north-east corner at the junction of Godlings Way and Notley Road, and to the western end from London Road.

References

Local Nature Reserves in Essex